Sitanda is a 2006 Nigerian adventure / drama film directed by African Movie Academy Award winner Ali Nuhu, and written by Fidel Akpom. The film received 9 nominations and won 5 awards at the 3rd Africa Movie Academy Awards in 2007, including Best Picture, Best Nigerian Film, Best Director and Best Original Screenplay.

Cast
Ali Nuhu
Stephanie Okereke
Azizat Sadiq
Ireti Doyle	
Justus Esiri
Bimbo Manuel

See also
 List of Nigerian films of 2006

References

External links
 

2006 drama films
2006 films
English-language Nigerian films
Best Film Africa Movie Academy Award winners
Films directed by Izu Ojukwu
Best Nigerian Film Africa Movie Academy Award winners
Nigerian adventure drama films
2000s English-language films